Vahtsõkivi Lake is a lake in Antsla Parish, Valga County, Estonia.

See also
List of lakes of Estonia

References

Antsla Parish
Lakes of Valga County